General elections were held in Fiji between 26 September and 8 October 1966, the last before independence in 1970 and the first held under universal suffrage. The result was a victory for the Alliance Party, which won 23 of the 34 elected seats. Its leader Kamisese Mara became the country's first Chief Minister the following year.

Background
A constitutional conference was held in London in 1965, which resulted in the Legislative Council being reorganised to consist of 36 seats; 14 for Fijians and other Pacific Islanders (two of which were nominated by the Great Council of Chiefs), 12 for Indo-Fijians and 10 for all other ethnic groups. The total number of registered voters was 156,683; 75,768 Indo-Fijians, 74,575 Fijians and 6,340 General electors.

Members of the Legislative Council were elected from two types of constituencies; communal and cross-voting, with voters being able to cast four votes each. Each voter cast a single vote in one of the 25 communal constituencies, in which they could only vote for a candidate of their own ethnicity. In the three three-seat cross-voting constituencies, voters voted for a candidate from each of the three ethnic groups.

Campaign
For the first time, the elections were a largely partisan event, dominated by the Fijian Alliance Party and the Indo-Fijian Federation Party. A total of 79 candidates contested the elections, three of which were women.

Results

By constituency

Aftermath
Following the elections, the two independents joined the Alliance Party. A new government was formed with Kamisese Mara as Leader of Government Business. The Executive Council consisted of six elected members and four civil servants.

At the first meeting of the Legislative Council on 11 November, Ronald Kermode was elected Speaker unopposed, with James Madhavan elected Deputy Speaker.

Full ministerial government was introduced on 1 September 1967. On the same day, the Federation Party MLCs walked out of the Legislative Council. After they missed three meetings, the nine Indo-Fijian communal seats were declared vacant and a series of by-elections held in 1968.

See also
List of members of the Parliament of Fiji (1966–1972)

References

Elections in Fiji
Fiji
General
Colony of Fiji
Fiji
Fiji
Fiji